The national emblem of Guinea-Bissau was adopted shortly after independence from Portugal in 1973.

Design 
Featured prominently is a black star, that is part of traditional Pan-African symbolism, and is often referred to as the Black star of Africa.  A seashell at the bottom unites two symmetrical olive branches.  The sea shell is symbolism for the location of the country on the West coast of Africa.

The red banner contains the national motto of Guinea-Bissau: that translates to English as "Unity, Struggle, Progress".

Historical coat of arms
In 1935, the Portuguese colonies were officially assigned coats of arms that followed a standard design pattern.

References

Coats of arms with olive branches
Coats of arms with seashells
Coats of arms with stars
National emblems
Emblem